The LIGO Scientific Collaboration (LSC) is a scientific collaboration of international physics institutes and research groups dedicated to the search for gravitational waves.

History
The LSC was established in 1997, under the leadership of Barry Barish. Its mission is to ensure equal scientific opportunity for individual participants and institutions by organizing research, publications, and all other scientific activities, and it includes scientists from both LIGO Laboratory and collaborating institutions. Barish appointed Rainer Weiss as the first spokesperson.

LSC members have access to the US-based Advanced LIGO detectors in Hanford, Washington and in Livingston, Louisiana, as well as the GEO 600 detector in Sarstedt, Germany. Under an agreement with the European Gravitational Observatory (EGO), LSC members also have access to data from the Virgo detector in Pisa, Italy. While the LSC and the Virgo Collaboration are separate organizations, they cooperate closely and are referred to collectively as "LVC". The KAGRA observatory's collaboration has joined the LIGO-Virgo collective, and the LIGO-Virgo-KAGRA collective is called "LVK".

The current LSC Spokesperson is Patrick Brady of University of Wisconsin-Milwaukee. The Executive Director of the LIGO Laboratory is David Reitze from the University of Florida.

On 11 February 2016, the LIGO and Virgo collaborations announced that they succeeded in making the first direct gravitational wave observation on 14 September 2015. 

In 2016, Barish received the Enrico Fermi Prize "for his fundamental contributions to the formation of the LIGO and LIGO-Virgo scientific collaborations and for his role in addressing challenging technological and scientific aspects whose solution led to the first detection of gravitational waves".

Collaboration members

Membership of LIGO Scientific Collaboration as of November 2015 is detailed in the table below.

Notes

References

External links
  
 LIGO Magazine

Gravitational-wave astronomy
Astronomy in the United States
Organizations based in California
Organizations based in Massachusetts
Organizations established in 1997
Albert Einstein Medal recipients